Melody Lane may refer to:

 Melody Lane (book series), series of books by Lilian Garis
 Melody Lane (1929 film), a lost black and white American musical film
 Melody Lane (1941 film), a 1941 American comedy film